"Cadmium" is a song recorded by the American rock band Pinegrove. The song was released on January 27, 2016 through Run for Cover Records, as the second single from the band's second studio album Cardinal. It was written by singer-songwriter Evan Stephens Hall.

Background
"Cadimum" was penned by Pinegrove frontman Evan Stephens Hall, who also sings, plays the guitar, and adds percussion to the track. Alongside Hall, siblings Nick and Zack Levine contribute vocals, guitar, and drums, while Adan Carlo Feliciano performed bass guitar. Hall, Nick, Zack, and Sam Skinner are credited with recording the material; all assisted in mixing as well.

"Cadmium" was inspired by the book I Send You This Cadmium Red by John Berger and John Christie, which includes a scene wherein one character sends a letter simply composed of a square. Hall at that time was sending letters to a friend on the West Coast, and the two eventually began exchanging shapes instead of words. The cover art of Cardinal, as well as several lyrics on the album, reference the color red either directly or through metaphor, most notably in "Cadmium".

Release and reception
Run for Cover issued "Cadmium" as the second single from Cardinal on January 27, 2016.

Ian Cohen at Pitchfork considered "Cadmium" as indicative of the album's overarching themes, specifically, "the failure of words to express what [Hall's character] really wants." James Rettig at Stereogum was positive in his impression of the single, writing, "Hall's revelations about communication are met with crisp affirmations from the rest of his band; each time the music drops out sounds like a step on the path to aligning what you say and how you feel." Jessica Goodman of The Line of Best Fit described the "cathartic" tune as a "twanging, chiming, pleading anthem".

Personnel
Credits adapted from Cardinal liner notes.
Pinegrove
 Evan Stephens Hall - guitar, vocals, percussion, songwriting, recording, mixing
 Zack Levine - drums, recording, mixing assistance
Additional personnel
 Adan Carlo Feliciano - bass
 Nandi Rose Plunkett - vocals 
 Nick Levine - guitar, recording, mixing assistance
 Sam Skinner - recording, mixing
Production
 Seth Engel – additional recording
 Greg Calbi – mastering engineer
 Steve Fallone – additional mastering

References

2016 singles
2016 songs
Pinegrove (band) songs